Candidimonas is a genus of bacteria from the family of Alcaligenaceae.

References

Further reading 
 
 

 

Burkholderiales
Bacteria genera